The New People's Army, abbreviated NPA or BHB, is the armed wing of the Communist Party of the Philippines (CPP), based primarily in the Philippine countryside. It acts as the CPP's principal organization, aiming to consolidate political power from what it sees as the present "bourgeois reactionary puppet government" and to aid in the "people's democratic revolution". Founded on March 29, 1969, by the collaboration of Jose Maria Sison and former members of the Hukbalahap led by Bernabe Buscayno, the NPA has since waged a guerrilla war based on the Maoist strategy of protracted people's war. The NPA is one of the key figures in the ongoing Communist rebellion in the Philippines, the longest ongoing conflict in the country.

The NPA operates in the Philippine countryside, where the CPP alleges it has established itself in 73 out of the country's 81 provinces, across over 110 guerrilla fronts. In guerrilla zones where the NPA has entrenched itself, the CPP–NPA has established a People's Democratic Government (Gobyernong Bayan), which operates independently of the Philippine government. Within these zones, income taxes which would nominally go to the government treasury instead go to the NPA, which they use to fund community services.

The NPA, as represented by the National Democratic Front of the Philippines, is a party to ongoing peace talks between the People's Democratic Government and the Government of the Republic of the Philippines. Peace negotiations have reached an impasse, with the Rodrigo Duterte administration unilaterally announcing the termination of peace talks in 2019. Negotiations between the GRP and the NDFP stalled on signing of the Comprehensive Agreement on Socio-Economic Reforms (CASER), and the issue of localized peace talks between individual units of the NPA.

The Office of the President of the Philippines designated the NPA as a terrorist group, along with the CPP. The United States and the European Union have designated the CPP–NPA as "foreign terrorist organizations" in 2002 and 2005, respectively.

History 

The New People's Army was established on March 29, 1969, following the split of the old Communist Party (Partido Komunista ng Pilipinas-1930) into Lava and Guerrero  factions. The 1960s saw a resurgence in radical ideology, following the establishment of Kabataang Makabayan and the emerging popularity of Mao Tse Tsung Thought as an advancement of ideological Marxism-Leninism. In 1966, Jose Maria Sison, under the nom de guerre Amado Guerrero, wrote Rectify Errors and Rebuild the Party!, a treatise which criticized the old Lavaite leadership and emphasized the need to follow Mao Tse Tung Thought to foster re-establishment. The conflict continued until December 26, 1968, when the Communist Party of the Philippines was formally re-established along Maoist lines, and the entire issue was termed the First Great Rectification Movement.

After re-establishing the CPP, Guerrero set about to establishing the People's Army. KM cadres in Tarlac had contacted Guerrero and linked him with Bernabe Buscayno, a former member of the older Hukbong Mapagpalaya ng Bayan. Relations were established and the New People's Army was formally founded on March 29, in continuity with the previous Hukbalahap. At the time the NPA only had 60 armed fighters.

The NPA was immediately tasked with the role of implementing the CPP's program for a People's Democratic Revolution. In the Declaration of the New People's Army, Amado Guerrero outlined the following as its main tasks:
 The New People's Army Must Engage in Party Rebuilding
 The New People's Army Must Carry Out Agrarian Revolution, Build Rural Bases, and Advance the Armed Struggle
 The New People's Army Must Build the National United Front

The NPA quickly spread alongside organizational work of the CPP. By 1972, it had established 735 barrio organizing committees and 60 barrio organizing committees, governing an estimated 400,000 people all over the country. The CPP used the NPA to establish barrio organizing and revolutionary committees, which served as instruments in administering the people's revolutionary government. Barrio organizing committees were established to lower land rent, eliminate usury, and ensure the "annihilation of enemy troops and the elimination of landlord despots, enemy spies, and such bad elements as cattle rustlers, extortionists, robbers, murderers, arsonists, and the like." Once established, barrio revolutionary committees replaced the BOC to formally establish the area as a stronghold of the revolutionary government. The NPA at the time had 72 squads of 800 regulars armed with weapons.

Over the next decade, the NPA expanded in response to Ferdinand Marcos and the declaration of martial law in the Philippines. The CPP and the NPA were successfully able to establish themselves in the countryside, reaching a mass base of over one million people, with 1,000 fighters armed with high-powered rifles by 1977 By 1981, the NPA began engaging in tactical offensives involving company-sized units emerged, particularly in the Southern Mindanao region. By 1983, the NPA fielded 5,000 high-powered rifles. By 1988, it had 10,000 high-powered rifles, with 7,000 inferior firearms. It operated in 60 guerrilla fronts across 63 provinces of the Philippines.

Changes in tactics and Kampanyang Ahos 
The momentum gained in the 1980s was also given to multiple setbacks. Changes in strategy and internal conflicts within the CPP resulted in ideological, political, and organizational losses for the CPP–NPA–NDF. The CPP devised a plan called a "strategic counteroffensive" (SCO) with the aim of "leaping over" to a higher stage of armed revolution and quickly win the revolution. The SCO program led to "regularization" of units, urban partisan actions, peasant uprisings, and an insurrectionist concept of "seizing opportunities".

From 1981, the NPA enjoyed strategic gains in Mindanao and was able to consolidate its forces there. However, the Mindanao Commission adopted a strategy of designating areas as Red (where military struggle was applicable) or White (where political struggle and insurrection was applicable) along with the SCO program.

Problems in discipline also emerged during this time, as well as deterioration of the NPA's ability to conduct mass work. These ideological and organizational shortcomings, coupled with the Corazon Aquino administration's counter-insurgency program, Oplan Lambat Bitag, managed to severely harm the NPA and the CPP as a whole.

In 1989, the NPA assassinated U.S. Army Colonel James "Nick" Rowe, founder of the U.S. Army Survival, Evasion, Resistance and Escape (SERE) course. Colonel Rowe was part of a military assistance program to the Philippine Army. The NPA asserts that this made him a legitimate military target.

Second Great Rectification Movement 

By 1991, the CPP central committee had assessed the mistakes of the previous decade and carried out the Second Great Rectification Movement from 1992 until declaring a success in 1998. The Second Great Rectification Movement, however, saw splits in the CPP ranks, with rejectionists such as Filemon Lagman, Romulo Kintanar, Etta Rosales, and others leaving the CPP and forming their own groups based on ideological differences. The Alex Boncayao Brigade, notorious for its partisan activities, left the CPP with Lagman and formed the Revolutionary Proletarian Army.

In 1998, the GRP and NDFP signed the Comprehensive Agreement on Human Rights and International Humanitarian Law (CAHRIHL), which establishes rules of engagement for both parties in accordance to international rules of war. The NPA, as a signatory to CAHIRHL, is bound to international agreements stated in the Geneva Convention and thus follows rules set for prisoners of war, command-detonated explosives, and similar rules of engagement.

Since then, rejectionists have been met with reprisals. Lagman was ambushed in the University of the Philippines in 2001 by armed gunmen and slain. The NPA has admitted to killing Kintanar in 2003. Other rejectionists, like Rosales and Walden Bello continue as members of the social-democratic Akbayan party. Ricardo Reyes is active in local politics, having last attempted to secure the mayoralty of Pasig in 2010.

Post-Rectification
The CPP declared the Second Great Rectification Movement as having been "conclusively won" in 1998. Since then, it has re-affirmed that the CPP is in absolute command of the NPA, outlining that its most pressing task is to "defeat and destroy the US-created and US-supported reactionary Armed Forces of the Philippines.

Since then, it has continued to wage a protracted people's war through the use of guerrilla tactics, while steadily expanding. In 2002, President Gloria Macapagal Arroyo requested for the United States Department of State to declare the CPP-NPA as a foreign terrorist group, which was granted on August 2. This was in line with her counter-insurgency program, Oplan Bantay Laya, which aimed to end the conflict between the AFP and the NPA. In 2005, the European Union Common Foreign and Security Policy included the NPA as a terrorist group. Despite these efforts, the NPA has declared Oplan Bantay Laya I a "failure", citing that it did not lose a single guerrilla front despite the AFP's efforts of concentrating its forces in 300 to 600 barrios at any given time.

In 2005, the NPA reported that its strength had surpassed its previous peak in 2005. Arroyo, at this time, had replaced OBL1 with Oplan Bantay Laya 2, which aimed at "ending the revolutionary movement by 2010". OBL2, along with what the CPP identified as "conservatism" in the ranks, led to a decline in NPA strength until 2009.

During the administration of Benigno Aquino III, OBL2 was replaced by Oplan Bayanihan, which had a more "people-centered" approach compared to OBL's military-heavy tactics. NPA membership, at this time, steadily rose. By 2017, NPA strength had surpassed the previous 2005 peak by 3%.

As of 2018, its strength is tallied at greater than the 5,600 rifles recorded in the CPP's 1985 plenum. The Central Committee has stated in its 2017 Congress that it has a five-year plan with aims to "carry forward the antifascist, antifeudal and anti-imperialist movement and overthrow the tyrannical US-Duterte regime, and bring the protracted people's war to the advanced phase of the strategic defensive, in order to reach the threshold of the strategic stalemate". The five-year plan:
 Aims to develop 7 to 10 advanced regions in terms of strength, spread, and advancement of guerrilla warfare, with approximately 20,000 Red fighters across spread across the country.
 Calls for the development of sub-regions, with one or two undersized companies and 9 to 15 horizontal platoons, interlocked across three to five company-sized guerrilla fronts.
 Aims for every region and sub-region should have one company-sized unit for every nine platoon-sized units, with recruitment campaigns utilized to achieve this goal.

The CPP five-year plan emphasizes the need to combat conservatism in the NPA ranks, the importance of mass-work in building and strengthening Party groups, and the intensification of guerrilla warfare against enemy targets.

The NPA has a long record of attacking mining corporations and logging companies which they accuse of harming the forests of the Philippines. In 2011 in revenge for the murder of anti-mining activist Rabenio Sungit, the NPA attacked three mines in Mindanao, causing 190 million dollars in damages. Some corporations willing to pay NPA taxes for local social programs are allowed to continue operating within NPA territory, those who do not are often attacked by the NPA who burn their equipment.

Ceasefires 
 In November 27, 1986, the Philippine government and rebels signed a 60-day ceasefire. This deal was rescinded in January 1987 following the events of the Mendiola massacre, where police fired on protesters and killed 13 farmers, injuring 30 more.
 The peace talks between the two sides were intermittent and inconclusive since 1986, bogging down in 2012 when the government refused to free political prisoners. They resumed in August 2016, when Duterte released 19 rebel leaders from jail. However, President Duterte scrapped talks in February 2017, when rebels ambushed an army convoy, breaking a unilateral ceasefire that had held for five months. Both sides returned to the negotiating table on April 1, 2017.
 In April 2017, peace talks between the National Democratic Front and the Philippine government brokered by Norway took place in the Netherlands, hoping to reach a political settlement in twelve months to end the conflict. This was the second time the two sides agreed on a bilateral truce since November 1986.
 As of 2019, the Duterte administration unilaterally declared the end of peace talks between the GRP and the NDFP, focusing instead on their counter-insurgency program Oplan Kapanatagan and what it terms as a "whole-of-nation" approach.

Ideology 
The NPA, being the primary organization of the CPP, follows a theoretical ideology of Marxism-Leninism-Maoism. It regards the Philippines as a semi-colonial, semi-feudal state where political and economic power is concentrated on a local class of landlords and comprador bourgeoisie, aided by foreign imperialists, chief of which is United States imperialism. The CPP regards a two-stage revolution of People's Democratic Revolution followed by socialist reconstruction as the path to achieve socialism and wrest control away from the bourgeois.

The CPP-NPA regards three things as central to waging revolution: armed struggle, agrarian revolution, and the building of mass-bases in the countryside. The NPA, aside from being a military force, also puts emphasis in carrying out land reform and organizational work to ensure that villages become bases of the people's democratic government.

The CPP regards armed struggle as a necessary component of revolution coinciding with the Party's organizational work. The NPA, as the central agent of armed struggle, serves to achieve its central task of "destroying and dismantling the rule of the enemy and taking their political power". In waging armed revolution, the NPA follows the strategic line of protracted people's war by "encircling the cities from the countryside until conditions are ripe for seizing the cities through a strategic offensive".

The NPA identifies three stages in waging armed struggle: strategic defensive, strategic stalemate, and strategic offensive. It regards itself as yet unable to conduct symmetric warfare in the urban centers and thus regards the people's war as being in a stage of strategic defensive moving to a stage of strategic stalemate. During the stage of strategic defensive, the NPA "maintains the initiative in tactical offensives against the strategic military advantage of the enemy", making use of guerrilla tactics to attack targets and defend guerrilla zones, while armed partisans perform special roles in the cities. The second stage is strategic stalemate, where fighting force is more or less equal, while the last stage is that of strategic offensive, where the NPA has developed its strength capable of assaulting military camps and cities.

The NPA regards itself as waging a revolution ultimately stemming from the "unfinished" revolution of the Katipunan, calling itself a revolution of the "new type"; whereas the Katipunan waged a "bourgeois democratic revolution of the old type, the NPA is waging a "proletarian socialist revolution" in the same vein as the October Revolution in Russia.

Promotion of LGBT rights 
In 2005, the NPA conducted the first recorded gay marriage in the history of the Philippines. In contrast to the deeply religious nature of mainstream Filipino society, the NPA leadership openly accepts gay and lesbian people into their ranks. However, members' attitudes within the various and largely isolated guerrilla branches can vary.

The former Filipino president Duterte mocked the NPA's acceptance of LGBT members, erroneously claiming that '40 percent' of NPA members are gay. Duterte also claimed that NPA guerrillas once attempted to sexually seduce his son. NPA co-founder Jose Maria Sison confirmed that the NPA openly accepted LGBT people and called Duterte's claims "unbelievable".

International relations 
The Philippine Army had apprehended Eduardo Quitoriano in 1994, who was a NPA liaison officer to the Japanese Red Army and involved in a money laundering case in Switzerland.

It is reported that the NPA had supported the Naxalites (of India) during the Naxalite–Maoist insurgency by providing training and technical support.

The CPP-NPA received large-scale support, in the form of arms, $7 million and logistical support, from the Gaddafi government in Libya.

Legal status 
The Government of the Philippines has outlawed the NPA along with the CPP as through the Anti-Subversion Act of 1957 which branded the Partido Komunista ng Pilipinas-1930 and the Hukbalahap as an "organized conspiracy". As splinter groups which had roots to the two organization, the ban extended to the CPP-NPA. The law was repealed by President Fidel Ramos in October 1992, decriminalizing membership in the NPA and CPP.

In December 2017, President Rodrigo Duterte declared the NPA along with the CPP as terrorist organizations. The NPA is also designated as a Foreign Terrorist Organization by the U.S. State Department and as a terrorist group by the EU, and New Zealand.

The Anti-Terror Council of the Philippines designated CPP-NPA as a terrorist organization in the Philippines on December 9, 2020.

The Manila Regional Trial Court has junked a proscription case by the Department of Justice seeking to designate the CPP-NPA as a terrorist organization on September 22, 2022. The court concluded that the constitution and program of the CPP-NPA, including its justification for armed struggle, fall under "rebellion" and do not constitute the legal definition of "terrorism".

See also 
 Communist rebellion in the Philippines
 Moro National Liberation Front
 Jose Maria Sison

References

External links 
 "Armed Conflict Report 2002, Philippines-CPP/NPA" (PDF).
 "U.S. Department of State – Philippine Communist Party Designated Foreign Terrorist Group".
 "New People's Army" (archived from the original on February 25, 2008). Extract of article about NPA's tactics and strategy, May 2006 (full article needs subscription).
 "Amnesty International Report 2003 – The Philippines".

Military wings of communist parties
Military units and formations established in 1969
Far-left politics
Guerrilla organizations
Communist guerrilla organizations
Maoist organizations
Military history of the Philippines
Anti-revisionist organizations
Rebel groups in the Philippines
Communist armed conflicts in the Philippines
Communist militant groups
Organisations designated as terrorist by the European Union
Organisations designated as terrorist by Japan
Organizations designated as terrorist by the United States
Organisations designated as terrorist by New Zealand
National Democratic Front of the Philippines